(an abbreviation for  in Japan) is a Japanese media franchise managed by The Pokémon Company, founded by Nintendo, Game Freak, and Creatures. The franchise was created by Satoshi Tajiri in 1996, and is centered around fictional creatures called "Pokémon". In Pokémon, Pokémon Trainers are people who catch, train, care for, and battle with Pokémon. The English slogan for the franchise is "Gotta Catch ‘Em All!". There are currently 1015 Pokémon species.

The franchise began as Pocket Monsters: Red and Green (later released outside of Japan as Pokémon Red and Blue), a pair of video games for the original Game Boy handheld system that were developed by Game Freak and published by Nintendo in February 1996. Pokémon soon became a media mix franchise adapted into various different media. Pokémon is one of the highest-grossing media franchises of all time. The Pokémon video game series is the third best-selling video game franchise of all time with more than  copies sold and onebillion mobile downloads. The Pokémon video game series spawned an anime television series that has become the most successful video game adaptation of all time with over 20 seasons and 1,000 episodes in 192 countries. The Pokémon Trading Card Game is the highest-selling trading card game of all time with over 43.2billion cards sold. In addition, the Pokémon franchise includes the world's top-selling toy brand, an anime film series, a live-action film (Detective Pikachu), books, manga comics, music, merchandise, and a temporary theme park. The franchise is also represented in other Nintendo media, such as the Super Smash Bros. series, where various Pokémon characters are playable.

History

The Pokémon franchise began as Pocket Monsters: Red and Green (later released outside of Japan as Pokémon Red and Blue), a pair of video games for the original Game Boy handheld system that were developed by Game Freak and published by Nintendo in February 1996. Pokémon soon became a media mix franchise adapted into various different media, with the Pokémon Trading Card Game released in October 1996, the Pokémon Adventures manga first released in Japan in March 1997, and the Pocket Monsters: Original Series released in April 1997. Pocket Pikachu was released in Japan in March 1998, with the July 18: with the first ever Pokémon film, Pokémon: The First Movie, first released in Japan in July 1998.

In 1998, Nintendo spent $25 million promoting Pokémon in the United States in partnership with Hasbro, KFC, and others. Nintendo initially feared that Pokémon was too Japanese for Western tastes but Alfred Kahn, then CEO of 4Kids Entertainment convinced the company otherwise. The one who spotted Pokémon's potential in the United States was Kahn's colleague Thomas Kenney.

In November 2005, 4Kids Entertainment, which had managed the non-game related licensing of Pokémon, announced that it had agreed not to renew the Pokémon representation agreement. The Pokémon Company International oversees all Pokémon licensing outside Asia. In 2006, the franchise celebrated its tenth anniversary with the release of Pokémon Diamond and Pearl. In 2016, the Pokémon Company celebrated Pokémons 20th anniversary by airing an ad during Super Bowl 50 in January and re-releasing the first Pokémon video games 1996 Game Boy games Pokémon Red, Green (only in Japan), and Blue, and the 1998 Game Boy Color game Pokémon Yellow for the Nintendo 3DS on February 26, 2016. The mobile augmented reality game Pokémon Go was released in July 2016. Pokémon Sun and Moon also released in the same year. The first live-action film in the franchise, Pokémon Detective Pikachu, based on the 2018 Nintendo 3DS spin-off game Detective Pikachu, was released in 2019. The eighth generation of core series games began with Pokémon Sword and Shield, released worldwide on the Nintendo Switch on November 15, 2019.

To celebrate its 25th anniversary, the company released two additional titles for the Nintendo Switch: Pokémon Brilliant Diamond and Shining Pearl, remakes of the Nintendo DS Pokémon Diamond and Pearl games, on November 19, 2021, and its "premake" Pokémon Legends: Arceus, which was subsequently released on January 28, 2022.

Pokémon Scarlet and Violet began the ninth generation of the game series when they released worldwide for the Nintendo Switch on November 18, 2022.

Name
The name "Pokémon" is a syllabic abbreviation of the Japanese brand Pocket Monsters. The term "Pokémon", in addition to referring to the Pokémon franchise itself, also collectively refers to the many fictional species that have made appearances in Pokémon media. "Pokémon" is identical in the singular and plural, as is each individual species name; it is and would be grammatically correct to say "one Pokémon" and "many Pokémon", as well as "one Pikachu" and "many Pikachu".

Concept

Gameplay 

Pokémon executive director Satoshi Tajiri first thought of Pokémon, albeit with a different concept and name, around 1989, when the Game Boy was released. The concept of the Pokémon universe, in both the video games and the general fictional world of Pokémon, stems from the hobby of insect collecting, a popular pastime which Tajiri enjoyed as a child. Players are designated as Pokémon Trainers and have three general goals: to complete the regional Pokédex by collecting all of the available Pokémon species found in the fictional region where a game takes place, to complete the national Pokédex by transferring Pokémon from other regions, and to train a team of powerful Pokémon from those they have caught to compete against teams owned by other Trainers so they may eventually win the Pokémon League and become the regional Champion. These themes of collecting, training, and battling are present in almost every version of the Pokémon franchise, including the video games, the anime and manga series, and the Pokémon Trading Card Game (also known as TCG).

In most incarnations of the Pokémon universe, a Trainer who encounters a wild Pokémon has the ability to capture that Pokémon by throwing a specially designed, mass-producible spherical tool called a Poké Ball at it. If the Pokémon is unable to escape the confines of the Poké Ball, it is considered to be under the ownership of that Trainer. Afterwards, it will obey whatever commands it receives from its new Trainer, unless the Trainer demonstrates such a lack of experience that the Pokémon would rather act on its own accord. Trainers can send out any of their Pokémon to wage non-lethal battles against other Pokémon; if the opposing Pokémon is wild, the Trainer can capture that Pokémon with a Poké Ball, increasing their collection of creatures. In Pokémon Go, and in Pokémon: Let's Go, Pikachu! and Let's Go, Eevee!, wild Pokémon encountered by players can be caught in Poké Balls, but most cannot be battled. Pokémon already owned by other Trainers cannot be captured, except under special circumstances in certain side games. If a Pokémon fully defeats an opponent in battle so that the opponent is knocked out ("faints"), the winning Pokémon gains experience points and may level up. Beginning with Pokémon X and Y, experience points are also gained from catching Pokémon in Poké Balls. When leveling up, the Pokémon's battling aptitude statistics ("stats", such as "Attack" and "Speed") increase. At certain levels, the Pokémon may also learn new moves, which are techniques used in battle. In addition, many species of Pokémon can undergo a form of metamorphosis and transform into a similar but stronger species of Pokémon, a process called evolution; this process occurs spontaneously under differing circumstances, and is itself a central theme of the series. Some species of Pokémon may undergo a maximum of two evolutionary transformations, while others may undergo only one, and others may not evolve at all. For example, the Pokémon Pichu may evolve into Pikachu, which in turn may evolve into Raichu, following which no further evolutions may occur. Pokémon X and Y introduced the concept of "Mega Evolution," by which certain fully evolved Pokémon may temporarily undergo an additional evolution into a stronger form for the purpose of battling; this evolution is considered a special case, and unlike other evolutionary stages, is reversible.

In the main series, each game's single-player mode requires the Trainer to raise a team of Pokémon to defeat many non-player character (NPC) Trainers and their Pokémon. Each game lays out a somewhat linear path through a specific region of the Pokémon world for the Trainer to journey through, completing events and battling opponents along the way (including foiling the plans of an evil team of Pokémon Trainers who serve as antagonists to the player). Excluding Pokémon Sun and Moon and Pokémon Ultra Sun and Ultra Moon, the games feature eight powerful Trainers, referred to as Gym Leaders, that the Trainer must defeat in order to progress. As a reward, the Trainer receives a Gym Badge, and once all eight badges are collected, the Trainer is eligible to challenge the region's Pokémon League, where four talented trainers (referred to collectively as the "Elite Four") challenge the Trainer to four Pokémon battles in succession. If the trainer can overcome this gauntlet, they must challenge the Regional Champion, the master Trainer who had previously defeated the Elite Four. Any Trainer who wins this last battle becomes the new champion.

Pokémon universe

Pokémon is set in the fictional Pokémon universe. There are numerous regions that have appeared in the various media of the Pokémon franchise. There are 9 main series regions set in the main series games: Kanto, Johto, Hoenn, Sinnoh/Hisui, Unova, Kalos, Alola, Galar, and Paldea. Each of the nine generations of the main series releases focuses on a new region. Every region consists of several cities and towns that the player must explore in order to overcome many waiting challenges, such as Gyms, Contests and villainous teams. At different locations within each region, the player can find different types of Pokémon, as well as helpful items and characters. Different regions are not accessible from one another at all within a single game, only with the exception of Kanto and Johto being linked together in Pokémon Gold, Silver, Crystal, HeartGold and SoulSilver versions. There are also regions set in spinoff games and two islands in the Pokémon anime (Orange Islands and Decolore Islands), all still set within the same fictional universe.

Each main series region in the Pokémon universe is based on a real world location. The first four regions introduced are based on locations in Japan, being Kantō, Kansai, Kyushu, and Hokkaidō, with later regions being based on parts on New York City, France, Hawaii, the United Kingdom, and the Iberian Peninsula.

Video games

Generations 

All of the licensed Pokémon properties overseen by the Pokémon Company International are divided roughly by generation. These generations are roughly chronological divisions by release; every several years, when a sequel to the 1996 role-playing video games Pokémon Red and Green is released that features new Pokémon, characters, and gameplay concepts, that sequel is considered the start of a new generation of the franchise. The main Pokémon video games and their spin-offs, the anime, manga, and trading card game are all updated with the new Pokémon properties each time a new generation begins. Some Pokémon from the newer games appear in anime episodes or films months, or even years, before the game they were programmed for came out. The first generation began in Japan with Pokémon Red and Green on the Game Boy. As of 2022, there are nine generations of main series video games. The most recent games in the main series, Pokémon Scarlet and Violet began the ninth and latest generation when they released worldwide for the Nintendo Switch on November 18, 2022.

List of Pokémon main series video games

In other media

Anime series 

Pokémon, also known as Pokémon the Series to Western audiences since the year 2013, is an anime television series based on the Pokémon video game series. It was originally broadcast on TV Tokyo in 1997. More than 1,000 episodes of the anime has been produced and aired, divided into 7 series in Japan and 22 seasons internationally. It is one of the longest currently running anime series.

The anime follows the quest of the main character, Ash Ketchum (known as Satoshi in Japan), a Pokémon Master in training, as he and a small group of friends travel around the world of Pokémon along with their Pokémon partners.

Various children's books, collectively known as Pokémon Junior, are also based on the anime.

An eight-part anime series called Pokémon: Twilight Wings aired on YouTube in 2020. The series was animated by Studio Colorido.

In July 2021, it was announced that a live action Pokémon series is in early development at Netflix with Joe Henderson attached to write and executive produce.

An eight part anime series in celebration of the Pokémon 25th anniversary called Pokémon Evolutions aired on YouTube in 2021.

Films

There have been 23 animated theatrical Pokémon films (latest film to be released on December 25, 2020), which have been directed by Kunihiko Yuyama and Tetsuo Yajima, and distributed in Japan by Toho since 1998. The pair of films, Pokémon the Movie: Black—Victini and Reshiram and White—Victini and Zekrom are considered together as one film. Collectibles, such as promotional trading cards, have been available with some of the films. Since the 20th film, the films have been set in an alternate continuity separate from the anime series.

Soundtracks

Pokémon CDs have been released in North America, some of them in conjunction with the theatrical releases of the first three and the 20th Pokémon films. These releases were commonplace until late 2001. On March 27, 2007, a tenth anniversary CD was released containing 18 tracks from the English dub; this was the first English-language release in over five years. Soundtracks of the Pokémon feature films have been released in Japan each year in conjunction with the theatrical releases. In 2017, a soundtrack album featuring music from the North American versions of the 17th through 20th movies was released.

 The exact date of release is unknown.

 Featuring music from Pokémon the Movie: Diancie and the Cocoon of Destruction, Pokémon the Movie: Hoopa and the Clash of Ages, Pokémon the Movie: Volcanion and the Mechanical Marvel, and Pokémon the Movie: I Choose You!

Pokémon Trading Card Game

 The Pokémon Trading Card Game (TCG) is a collectible card game with a goal similar to a Pokémon battle in the video game series. Players use Pokémon cards, with individual strengths and weaknesses, in an attempt to defeat their opponent by "knocking out" their Pokémon cards. The game was published in North America by Wizards of the Coast in 1999. With the release of the Game Boy Advance video games Pokémon Ruby and Sapphire, the Pokémon Company took back the card game from Wizards of the Coast and started publishing the cards themselves. The Expedition expansion introduced the Pokémon-e Trading Card Game, where the cards (for the most part) were compatible with the Nintendo e-Reader. Nintendo discontinued its production of e-Reader compatible cards with the release of FireRed and LeafGreen. In 1998, Nintendo released a Game Boy Color version of the trading card game in Japan; Pokémon Trading Card Game was subsequently released to the US and Europe in 2000. The game included digital versions of cards from the original set of cards and the first two expansions (Jungle and Fossil), as well as several cards exclusive to the game. A sequel was released in Japan in 2001.

Manga

There are various Pokémon manga series, four of which were released in English by Viz Media, and seven of them released in English by Chuang Yi. The manga series vary from game-based series to being based on the anime and the Trading Card Game. Original stories have also been published. As there are several series created by different authors, most Pokémon manga series differ greatly from each other and other media, such as the anime. Pokémon Pocket Monsters and Pokémon Adventures are the two manga in production since the first generation.

Manga released in English
The Electric Tale of Pikachu (Dengeki Pikachu), a shōnen manga created by Toshihiro Ono. It was divided into four tankōbon, each given a separate title in the North American and English Singapore versions: The Electric Tale of Pikachu, Pikachu Shocks Back, Electric Pikachu Boogaloo, and Surf's Up, Pikachu. The series is based loosely on the anime.
Pokémon Adventures (Pocket Monsters SPECIAL in Japan) by Hidenori Kusaka (story), Mato (art formerly), and Satoshi Yamamoto (art currently), the most popular Pokémon manga based on the video games. The story series around the Pokémon Trainers who called "Pokédex holders".
Magical Pokémon Journey (Pocket Monsters PiPiPi ★ Adventures), a shōjo manga
Pikachu Meets the Press (newspaper style comics, not released by Chuang Yi)
Ash & Pikachu (Satoshi to Pikachu)
Pokémon Gold & Silver
Pokémon Ruby-Sapphire and Pokémon Pocket Monsters
Pokémon: Jirachi Wish Maker
Pokémon: Destiny Deoxys
Pokémon: Lucario and the Mystery of Mew (the third movie-to-comic adaptation)
Pokémon Ranger and the Temple of the Sea (the fourth movie-to-comic adaption)
Pokémon Diamond and Pearl Adventure!
Pokémon Adventures: Diamond and Pearl / Platinum
Pokémon: The Rise of Darkrai (the fifth movie-to-comic adaption)
Pokémon: Giratina and the Sky Warrior (the sixth movie-to-comic adaption)
Pokémon: Arceus and the Jewel of Life (the seventh movie-to-comic adaption)
Pokémon: Zoroark: Master of Illusions (the eighth movie-to-comic adaption)
Pokémon The Movie: White: Victini and Zekrom (the ninth movie-to-comic adaption)
Pokémon Black and White
Manga not released in English
Pokémon Pocket Monsters by Kosaku Anakubo, the first Pokémon manga. Chiefly a gag manga, it stars a Pokémon Trainer named Red, his rude Clefairy, and Pikachu.
Pokémon Card ni Natta Wake (How I Became a Pokémon Card) by Kagemaru Himeno, an artist for the Trading Card Game. There are six volumes and each includes a special promotional card. The stories tell the tales of the art behind some of Himeno's cards.
Pokémon Get aa ze! by Miho Asada
Pocket Monsters Chamo-Chamo ★ Pretty ♪ by Yumi Tsukirino, who also made Magical Pokémon Journey.
Pokémon Card Master
Pocket Monsters Emerald Chōsen!! Battle Frontier by Ihara Shigekatsu
Pocket Monsters Zensho by Satomi Nakamura

Live-action series
In July 2021, it was announced that a live-action Pokémon series is reportedly in development at Netflix. Joe Henderson, showrunner of Lucifer, is signed on as writer and executive producer.

Criticisms and controversies

Morality and religious beliefs
Pokémon has been criticized by some fundamentalist Christians over perceived occult and violent themes and the concept of "Pokémon evolution", which they feel goes against the Biblical creation account in Genesis. Sat2000, a satellite television station based in Vatican City, has countered that the Pokémon Trading Card Game and video games are "full of inventive imagination" and have no "harmful moral side effects". In the United Kingdom, the "Christian Power Cards" game was introduced in 1999 by David Tate who stated, "Some people aren't happy with Pokémon and want an alternative, others just want Christian games." The game was similar to the Pokémon Trading Card Game but used Biblical figures.

In 1999, Nintendo stopped manufacturing the Japanese version of the "Koga's Ninja Trick" trading card because it depicted a manji, a traditionally Buddhist symbol with no negative connotations. The Jewish civil rights group Anti-Defamation League complained because the symbol is the reverse of a swastika, a Nazi symbol. The cards were intended for sale in Japan only, but the popularity of Pokémon led to import into the United States with approval from Nintendo. The Anti-Defamation League understood that the portrayed symbol was not intended to offend and acknowledged the sensitivity that Nintendo showed by removing the product.

In 1999, two nine-year-old boys from Merrick, New York, sued Nintendo because they claimed the Pokémon Trading Card Game caused their problematic gambling.

In 2001, Saudi Arabia banned Pokémon games and the trading cards, alleging that the franchise promoted Zionism by displaying the Star of David in the trading cards (the Colorless energy from the Pokémon Trading Card Game resembles a six-pointed star) as well as other religious symbols such as crosses they associated with Christianity and triangles they associated with Freemasonry; the games also involved gambling, which is in violation of Muslim doctrine.

Pokémon has also been accused of promoting materialism.

Animal cruelty
In 2012, PETA criticized the concept of Pokémon as supporting cruelty to animals. PETA compared the game's concept, of capturing animals and forcing them to fight, to cockfights, dog fighting rings and circuses, events frequently criticized for cruelty to animals. PETA released a game spoofing Pokémon where the Pokémon battle their trainers to win their freedom. PETA reaffirmed their objections in 2016 with the release of Pokémon Go, promoting the hashtag #GottaFreeThemAll.

Health

On December 16, 1997, more than 635 Japanese children were admitted to hospitals with epileptic seizures. It was determined the seizures were caused by watching an episode of Pokémon "Dennō Senshi Porygon", (most commonly translated "Electric Soldier Porygon", season 1, episode 38); as a result, this episode has not been aired since. In this particular episode, there were bright explosions with rapidly alternating blue and red color patterns. It was determined in subsequent research that these strobing light effects cause some individuals to have epileptic seizures, even if the person had no previous history of epilepsy. This incident is a common focus of Pokémon-related parodies in other media, and was lampooned by The Simpsons episode "Thirty Minutes over Tokyo" in a short cameo and the South Park episode "Chinpokomon", among others.

Pokémon Go

Within its first two days of release, Pokémon Go raised safety concerns among players. Multiple people also suffered minor injuries from falling while playing the game due to being distracted.

Multiple police departments in various countries have issued warnings, some tongue-in-cheek, regarding inattentive driving, trespassing, and being targeted by criminals due to being unaware of one's surroundings. People have suffered various injuries from accidents related to the game, and Bosnian players have been warned to stay out of minefields left over from the 1990s Bosnian War. On July 20, 2016, it was reported that an 18-year-old boy in Chiquimula, Guatemala, was shot and killed while playing the game in the late evening hours. This was the first reported death in connection with the app. The boy's 17-year-old cousin, who was accompanying the victim, was shot in the foot. Police speculated that the shooters used the game's GPS capability to find the two.

Cultural influence

Pokémon, being a globally popular franchise, has left a significant mark on today's popular culture. The various species of Pokémon have become pop culture icons; examples include two different Pikachu balloons in the Macy's Thanksgiving Day Parade, Pokémon-themed airplanes operated by All Nippon Airways, merchandise items, and a traveling theme park that was in Nagoya, Japan in 2005 and in Taipei in 2006. Pokémon also appeared on the cover of the U.S. magazine Time in 1999. The Comedy Central show Drawn Together has a character named Ling-Ling who is a parody of Pikachu. Several other shows such as The Simpsons, South Park and Robot Chicken have made references and spoofs of Pokémon, among other series. Pokémon was featured on VH1's I Love the '90s: Part Deux. A live action show based on the anime called Pokémon Live! toured the United States in late 2000. Jim Butcher cites Pokémon as one of the inspirations for the Codex Alera series of novels.

Pokémon has even made its mark in the realm of science. This includes animals named after Pokémon, such as Stentorceps weedlei (named after the Pokémon Weedle for its resemblance) and Chilicola charizard (named after the Pokémon Charizard) as well as Binburrum articuno, Binburrum zapdos, and Binburrum moltres (named after the Pokémon Articuno, Zapdos, and Moltres, respectively). There is also a protein named after Pikachu, called Pikachurin.

In November 2001, Nintendo opened a store called the Pokémon Center in New York, in Rockefeller Center, modeled after the two other Pokémon Center stores in Tokyo and Osaka and named after a staple of the video game series. Pokémon Centers are fictional buildings where Trainers take their injured Pokémon to be healed after combat. The store sold Pokémon merchandise on a total of two floors, with items ranging from collectible shirts to stuffed Pokémon plushies. The store also featured a Pokémon Distributing Machine in which players would place their game to receive an egg of a Pokémon that was being given out at that time. The store also had tables that were open for players of the Pokémon Trading Card Game to duel each other or an employee. The store was closed and replaced by the Nintendo World Store on May 14, 2005. Four Pokémon Center kiosks were put in malls in the Seattle area. The Pokémon Center online store was relaunched on August 6, 2014.

Professor of education Joseph Tobin theorizes that the success of the franchise was due to the long list of names that could be learned by children and repeated in their peer groups. Its rich fictional universe provides opportunities for discussion and demonstration of knowledge in front of their peers. The names of the creatures were linked to its characteristics, which converged with the children's belief that names have symbolic power. Children can pick their favourite Pokémon and affirm their individuality while at the same time affirming their conformance to the values of the group, and they can distinguish themselves from others by asserting what they liked and what they did not like from every chapter. Pokémon gained popularity because it provides a sense of identity to a wide variety of children, and lost it quickly when many of those children found that the identity groups were too big and searched for identities that would distinguish them into smaller groups.

Pokémons history has been marked at times by rivalry with the Digimon media franchise that debuted at a similar time. Described as "the other 'mon by IGN's Juan Castro, Digimon has not enjoyed Pokémons level of international popularity or success, but has maintained a dedicated fanbase. IGN's Lucas M. Thomas stated that Pokémon is Digimons "constant competition and comparison", attributing the former's relative success to the simplicity of its evolution mechanic as opposed to Digivolution. The two have been noted for conceptual and stylistic similarities by sources such as GameZone. A debate among fans exists over which of the two franchises came first. In actuality, the first Pokémon media, Pokémon Red and Green, were released initially on February 27, 1996; whereas the Digimon virtual pet was released on June 26, 1997.

Fan community

While Pokémons target demographic is children, early purchasers of Pokémon Omega Ruby and Alpha Sapphire were in their 20s. Many fans are adults who originally played the games as children and had later returned to the series.

Numerous fan sites exist for the Pokémon franchise, including , a site hosting the wiki-based encyclopedia Bulbapedia, and Serebii, a news and reference website. Large fan communities exist on other platforms, such as the subreddit r/pokemon, which has over 4 million subscribers.

A significant community around the Pokémon video games' metagame has existed for a long time, analyzing the best ways to use each Pokémon to their full potential in competitive battles. The most prolific competitive community is Smogon University, which has created a widely accepted tier-based battle system.
Smogon is affiliated with an online Pokémon game called Pokémon Showdown, in which players create a team and battle against other players around the world using the competitive tiers created by Smogon.

In early 2014, an anonymous video streamer on Twitch launched Twitch Plays Pokémon, a small experiment trying to crowdsource playing subsequent Pokémon games, that started with the game Pokémon Red and has since included subsequent games in the series.

A study at Stanford Neurosciences published in Nature performed magnetic resonance imaging scans of 11 Pokémon experts and 11 controls, finding that seeing Pokémon stimulated activity in the visual cortex, in a different place than is triggered by recognizing faces, places, or words, demonstrating the brain's ability to create such specialized areas.

Notes

References

Further reading

 Tobin, Joseph, ed. (February 2004). Pikachu's Global Adventure: The Rise and Fall of Pokémon. Duke University Press. .

External links

 
  
 
 
 

 
1990s fads and trends
1990s toys
2000s toys
2010s toys
Japanese brands
Mass media franchises
Mass media franchises introduced in 1996
Nintendo franchises